Ministry of Health is ministry of Bhutan responsible for management and development of health reforms in the country.

Departments 
The Ministry of Health is responsible for: 
Department of Public Health  
Department of Public Services

Minister 
 Sangay Ngedup (in 1998–99 as Minister of Health and Education)
 Zangley Dukpa (as Minister of Health)
 Dechen Wangmo (7 November 2018 – present)

References

Health
Bhutan
Health in Bhutan